Necip Uysal (born 24 January 1991) is a Turkish professional footballer who plays as a midfielder for Turkish club Beşiktaş.

Uysal started his footballing career with amateur side Yıldırım Bosnaspor in 2001. He spent three years with the club before being transferred to Beşiktaş. Uysal made his professional debut during the 2009–10 Süper Lig season.

Personal life
Uysal is of Kosovar Albanian descent.

Career statistics

Honours
Beşiktaş
Süper Lig: 2015–16, 2016–17, 2020–21
Türkiye Kupası: 2010–11, 2020–21
Turkish Super Cup: 2021

References

External links
 
 
 
 
 
 Necip Uysal Profile on Besiktas Official Website

1991 births
Living people
People from Bakırköy
Footballers from Istanbul
Turkish footballers
Association football midfielders
Turkey international footballers
Turkey B international footballers
Turkey under-21 international footballers
Turkey youth international footballers
Turkish people of Kosovan descent
Beşiktaş J.K. footballers
Süper Lig players
21st-century Turkish people